Holly Bethan Bradshaw (née Bleasdale, born 2 November 1991) is a British track and field athlete who specialises in the pole vault. She is the current British record holder in the event indoors and outdoors, with clearances of 4.87 metres (2012 indoors) and 4.90 metres (2021 outdoors). Bradshaw won a bronze medal at the 2020 Summer Olympics. She also won bronze at the 2012 World Indoor Championships, gold at the 2013 European Indoor Championships, bronze at the 2018 European Championships, and silver at the 2019 European Indoor Championships. She also won at the 2018 Athletics World Cup. Coached by Scott Simpson, she has been consistently ranked among the world's best and has been ranked in the world top ten on the Track and Field News merit rankings four times (2012, 2013, 2016, 2017).

Early life 
Bradshaw was involved in gymnastics from the age of six until she was 11, when she decided to try running. It was not until she was 17 that she tried pole vaulting for the first time.

Education
Bradshaw was educated at Parklands Languages High School, a co-educational state comprehensive school in the town of Chorley in Lancashire, in North West England. She attended Runshaw College in Leyland from 2008 to 2010, where she completed her A-Levels. She is now studying for a degree in Sports Exercise and Science at Manchester Met University via distance learning to allow time for her training.

Career

Bradshaw's Junior career took off when she broke the British Junior pole vault record in June 2010, with a vault of 4.35m. A month later, she competed at the 2010 World Junior Championship, in which she was the favourite for the gold medal. However, she failed to vault higher than 4.15m, resulting in a bronze medal behind Angelica Bengtsson and Victoria von Eynatten, who vaulted 4.25m and 4.20m respectively.

Bradshaw's first competition of the 2011 season was the 2011 European Indoor Championships, where she finished 11th in the qualifying round, with a best vault of 4.45m.
Later in 2011, she represented Great Britain in the European Team Championships, where she finished in 5th place.

In June 2011, Bradshaw set a new British U23 record with a 4.53m vault at the British Under-23 Championships in Bedford. However, just 5 days later, she set a new British senior record of 4.70m.

In January 2012, Bradshaw improved the British indoor record by clearing 4.87m in Villeurbanne, during a Perche Élite Tour meeting. This put her third on the world all-time list, behind Yelena Isinbayeva and Jenn Suhr, and also third all-time for indoor performances. At the same competition she made her first world indoor record attempt at 5.01m, but failed. Later that year, on 11 March she won a bronze medal at the World Indoor Championships held in Istanbul.

Bradshaw competed in the 2012 Summer Olympics in London. She managed to reach the final, but knocked the bar at 4.55m, causing her to crash out of the running for a medal. However, she managed to finish in the top 8. In an interview with BBC Radio 5 Live, Bradshaw said that she was disappointed but that "by Rio, I will be at the top of my game." Bradshaw won gold at the 2013 European Athletics Indoor Championships in Gothenburg with a height of 4.67m in a jump off with Poland's Anna Rogowska, both having previously jumped 4.72. She later stated in an interview that she could have shared gold with Rogowska, but chose to jump off to be the lone winner of the gold.

In 2015 Bradshaw vaulted 4.55 m to be selected in the British Team to the world Championships. At the World Championships in Beijing, Bleasdale cleared 4.70 m before failing at 4.80 m. With this height, she finished 7th in the final where the Cuban Yarisley Silva took the gold medal with a jump of 4.90 m.

2016 Olympic 
Bradshaw competed in the Rio 2016 Summer Olympics, jumping 4.60m to advance to the final. In the final she cleared 4.70m on her second attempt but failed her three attempts at 4.80m and finished fifth. She almost cleared her last attempt at 4.80m but in the last moment the cross bar fell to the ground.

After the Olympics, she competed in 2016 Diamond League in Zurich, winning first place with 4.76m.

2017 
Bradshaw participated in many of the 2017 Diamond League meetings, and also reached the finals of the Diamond League in Brussels. She set a new personal best outdoors in Manchester in the same year at 4.81m. She participated in other notable events of pole vault around the world that year, which secured her a place in the 2017 IAAF World Championships in London in front of the home crowd, where she ended up 6th with a jump of 4.65m, and she lost the bronze medal only on count back. She has been hoping to seek glory that was taken away from her in the 2012 Olympic games in the same stadium, and afterward said she would focus on the 2018 IAAF World Indoor Championships in Birmingham. She also won the national outdoor championships in 2017.

2018 
Bradshaw started her 2018 indoor season in February, competing in the Perche Élite Tour meet in Rouen, France, where she won with a clearance of 4.60 metres before going on to clear 4.70m on 30 March at an outdoor competition in Australia. As one of the favourites for the pole vault title at the 2018 Commonwealth Games on the Gold Coast, she finished fourth with another clearance of 4.60m. After clearing a season's best of 4.72 metres on 8 July in Rottach-Egern, she went on to win the biggest outdoor title of her career on 14 July 2018, when she won at the inaugural Athletics World Cup in London, improving her season's best to 4.75 metres. She further improved her season's best to 4.80 metres on 17 July in Jockgrim, before winning a bronze medal on 9 August at the European Championships in Berlin, with another clearance of 4.75 metres.

2019 
Bradshaw had a good start in the early 2019 by winning the indoor nationals with a jump of 4.80m in February. She was selected for the 2019 IAAF World Athletics Championships in Doha, Qatar, reaching for the final with a single jump of 4.60m in qualifying. She subsequently finished in fourth place in the final.

2020
Bradshaw became British champion for a sixth consecutive year and eighth time in total when winning the pole vault event at the 2020 British Athletics Championships with a jump of 4.35 metres.

2021 
At the delayed Tokyo Olympics, Bradshaw won the bronze medal with a jump of 4.85 m. That year, she also set a new GB record outdoors, with a jump of 4.90 m.

2022
While competing in the qualifying competition for the 2022 World Athletics Championships Bradshaw's pole snapped and withdrew from the competition.

International competitions

Note: Bradshaw had three failures at her opening height of 4.25m in the qualifying round at the 2011 World Championships'''

Note: in 2021 Bradshaw came joint third at the European Athletics Indoor Championships in Torun, Poland with Iryna Zhuk of Belerus'''

Personal life
After her disappointment at finishing in sixth place at the London 2012 Olympic Games, Bradshaw, then still Bleasdale, announced on Twitter that she had accepted the marriage proposal of her long-term boyfriend, Paul Bradshaw. She stated that this made it the "best day ever". Her tweet was as follows: "6th in the Olympics and @bradshaaaw proposes to me :) epic day!!!" Bradshaw's tweet in reply read: "I have just proposed to @HollyBleasdale and she said yes!!!!! Best day ever!"

Having competed previously under her maiden name, Bradshaw confirmed she would return to action under her married name in 2015.

In an interview in February 2018, Bradshaw stated that she intends to focus on pole vaulting for the next three years, with her main aims being to win the 2019 World Championships in Doha, the 2020 Tokyo Olympics and to clear five metres, before starting a family in 2021.

References

External links

 
 
 
 
 
 
 

1991 births
Living people
Sportspeople from Preston, Lancashire
English female pole vaulters
British female pole vaulters
Olympic female pole vaulters
Olympic athletes of Great Britain
Athletes (track and field) at the 2012 Summer Olympics
Athletes (track and field) at the 2016 Summer Olympics
Commonwealth Games competitors for England
Athletes (track and field) at the 2018 Commonwealth Games
World Athletics Championships athletes for Great Britain
European Athletics Indoor Championships winners
British Athletics Championships winners
Athletes (track and field) at the 2020 Summer Olympics
Medalists at the 2020 Summer Olympics
Olympic bronze medallists for Great Britain
Olympic bronze medalists in athletics (track and field)